The 1965 Star World Championships were held in Newport Harbor, United States in 1965.

Results

References

Star World Championships
1965 in sailing
Star World Championships in the United States